Leptopsaltriini is a tribe of cicadas in the family Cicadidae. There are at least 200 described species in Leptopsaltriini, found in the Palearctic, Nearctic, and Indomalaya.

Genera
BioLib includes the following genera in six subtribes:
subtribe Euterpnosiina Lee, 2013
 Calcagninus Distant, 1892 c g
 Euterpnosia Matsumura, 1917 c g
 Miniterpnosia Lee, 2013 c g
 Neoterpnosia Lee & Emery, 2014 c g
 Paranosia Lee, 2014 c g
 Yezoterpnosia Matsumura, 1917 c g
subtribe Gudabina Boulard, 2008
 Gudaba Distant, 1906 c g
 Rustia Stål, 1866 c g
subtribe Leptopsaltriina J.C. Moulton, 1923
 Aetanna Lee, 2014 c g
 Cabecita Lee, 2014 c g
 Formocicada Lee & Hayashi, 2004 c g
 Galgoria Lee, 2016 c g
 Inthaxara Distant, 1913 c g
 Leptopsaltria Stål, 1866 c g
 Nabalua Moulton, 1923 c g
 Neocicada Kato, 1932 i c g b
 Onomacritus (cicada) Distant, 1912
 Puranoides Moulton, 1917 c g
 Taiwanosemia Matsumura, 1917 c g
 Tanna Distant, 1905 c g
subtribe Leptosemiina Lee, 2013
 Leptosemia Matsumura, 1917 c g
 Minipomponia Boulard, 2008 c g
subtribe Mosaicina Lee, 2013
 Manna Lee & Emery, 2013 c g
 Masamia Lee & Emery, 2013 c g
 Mosaica Lee & Emery, 2013 c g
subtribe Puranina Lee, 2013
 Formosemia Matsumura, 1917 c g
 Maua Distant, 1905 c g
 Paratanna Lee, 2012 c g
 Purana Distant, 1905 c g
 Qurana Lee, 2009 c g

Data sources: i = ITIS, c = Catalogue of Life, g = GBIF, b = Bugguide.net

References

Further reading

External links

 

 
Cicadinae
Hemiptera tribes